is a Japanese video game developer, illustrator, musician, composer and voice actor. He is best known for creating the 2D fighting game series Guilty Gear. He designed the characters and storyline, and wrote the music. He also provides the in-game voice for the characters Sol Badguy and Order-Sol, as well as Freed Velez in Battle Fantasia.

Ishiwatari was born in Johannesburg, South Africa and raised in Japan.

Ishiwatari worked with Arc System Works on the first Guilty Gear as soon as he left school. Recently, Ishiwatari, along with Yoshihiro Kusano, also wrote the music for BlazBlue, as well as painting the character selection portraits for the sequel, BlazBlue: Continuum Shift. As well as this, he has also composed for Hard Corps: Uprising.

Ishiwatari is also noted as being a composer in the metal and rock genres. His compositions, found in his signature series, Guilty Gear, feature intricate guitar work, as do his compositions found in BlazBlue. The albums Guilty Gear XX in LA and Guilty Gear XX in NY include vocals for selected songs, as do three albums in Japanese by the band Lapis Lazuli.

Productions
Virtual Open Tennis (assistant designer)
EXECTOR (designer)
Guilty Gear series (illustration, creation and BGM)
Sangokushi Taisen DS (original Ba Tai design)
Dimension Zero (card illustration)
BlazBlue (sound director)
Hard Corps Uprising (design, BGM)

Appearance

Games
Guilty Gear series (Sol Badguy, Order-Sol) (1998-2007, replaced by Jouji Nakata as of 2007 onward.)
Battle Fantasia (Freed Velez)

Radio
Cafe Arc
Guilty Gear Web Radio
Isotchi no Shūkan Shakishaki (guest appearance)
Impress TV (guest appearance)
BlueRadio (3rd guest appearances)
Zoku – BlueRadio (12th guest appearances)

Discography

Albums
Guilty Gear Strive Original Sound Track (2021)
Guilty Gear Xrd -SIGN- Vocal Collection (2014)
Guilty Gear X Blazblue OST Live (2011)
BlazBlue Song Accord No. 2 with Continuum Shift II (2010)
BlazBlue Song Accord No. 1 with Continuum Shift (2009)
BlazBlue: Calamity Trigger Original Soundtrack ~Bonus Discs~ (2009)
BlazBlue: Calamity Trigger Original Soundtrack ~Consumer Edition~ (2009)
Guilty Gear XX Λ Core – Secret Gig （2008）
Aksys Games 2008 Promotional CD （2008）
BlazBlue: Calamity Trigger Original Soundtrack (2008)
Guilty Gear 2 Overture Original Soundtrack Vol.1 （2007）
Guilty Gear 2 Overture Original Soundtrack Vol.2 （2008）
Guilty Gear Isuka Original Soundtrack （2004）
Guilty Gear Original Sound Collection （1998）
Guilty Gear Series Best Sound Collection （2003）
Guilty Gear Sound Complete Box (2005）
Guilty Gear X Heavy Rock Tracks ~ The Original Soundtrack of Dreamcast （2001）
Guilty Gear X Original Sound Track （2000）
Guilty Gear X Rising Force Of Gear Image Vocal Tracks -Side.I ROCK YOU!!- （2001）
Guilty Gear X Rising Force Of Gear Image Vocal Tracks -Side.II SLASH!!- （2001）
Guilty Gear X Rising Force Of Gear Image Vocal Tracks -Side.III DESTROY!!- （2001）
Guilty Gear XX in L.A. Vocal Edition （2004）
Guilty Gear XX in N.Y Vocal Edition （2004）
Guilty Gear XX Original Soundtrack （2002）
Guilty Gear XX Sound Alive （2003）

References

External links

 Game credits at MobyGames
Artist profile at OverClocked ReMix
 
 

1973 births
Japanese composers
Japanese illustrators
Japanese male composers
Japanese male video game actors
Japanese male voice actors
Japanese video game designers
Living people
People from Johannesburg
Video game artists
Video game composers